Seven Sinners is a 1925 American black-and-white silent comedy crime film directed by Lewis Milestone and written by Milestone and Darryl F. Zanuck. The film was produced by Warner Bros. Pictures.

Although Milestone had directed short training films for the U.S. War Department in 1918 and 1919, and acted as assistant director on the 1921 William A. Seiter film The Foolish Age, this was his feature film directorial debut.

Plot
Burglars Molly Brian (Marie Prevost) and Joe Hagney (John Patrick) break into the Vickers mansion on Long Island and loot the safe but are caught in the act by another crook, Jerry Winters (Clive Brook), who takes the money from them.  The three are confronted by Pious Joe McDowell (Claude Gillingwater) and his wife Mamie (Mathilde Brundage), also crooks, but who assert themselves as friends of the Vickers family. Molly, Joe, and Jerry introduce themselves in turn as Vickers' household servants.  A doctor (Dan Mason) arrives with his patient (Heinie Conklin) and quarantines the house.  Unknown to the first five, the Doctor and patient are also crooks who use the ruse of a "quarantine" as part of their own methodology.  During the brief quarantine, Molly ends up falling in love with Jerry and the two pledge to go straight.  When the police (Fred Kelsey) finally arrive, Pious Joe takes responsibility for the robbery so that Molly and Jerry can escape.

Cast
 Marie Prevost as Molly Brian
 Clive Brook as Jerry Winters
 John Patrick as Handsome Joe Hagney
 Heinie Conklin as Scarlet Fever Sanders
 Claude Gillingwater as Pious Joe McDowell
 Mathilde Brundage as Mamie McDowell
 Dan Mason as Doctor
 Fred Kelsey as Policeman

Contemporary reception
The New York Times wrote the idea "has been worked out in an interesting fashion, with disappointing penitence as a closing touch," and that "picture is quite diverting, and it would have been even better if the humor were lighter in some sequences and if a touch of satire had been included at the finish."

Legacy

Preservation status
The film was presumed lost when Jack Warner destroyed many of its negatives in December 1948 due to nitrate decomposition of pre-1933 films, but an announcement was made in May 2015 of its rediscovery in Queensland, Australia.

Seven Sinners was preserved by the Academy Film Archive in 2017. The restored version of Seven Sinners was shown in Queensland, Australia, on February 19, 2017.

See also
 List of rediscovered films

References

External links
 
 
 
 

1925 films
American crime comedy films
American comedy mystery films
American silent feature films
American black-and-white films
Films directed by Lewis Milestone
Warner Bros. films
Films set in New York (state)
1920s crime comedy films
1920s rediscovered films
1925 directorial debut films
1920s comedy mystery films
Rediscovered American films
Surviving American silent films
1920s English-language films
1920s American films
Silent American comedy films
Silent comedy mystery films
Silent crime comedy films